Guiragos (last name unknown), also spelled Gyrakos, was a Lebanese footballer who played as a midfielder.

Guiragos played for Homenetmen during the 1940s at club level. He took part in Lebanon's first international match against Mandatory Palestine in 1940.

References

External links
 

Year of birth missing
Year of death missing
Lebanese people of Armenian descent
Ethnic Armenian sportspeople
Association football midfielders
Lebanese footballers
Homenetmen Beirut footballers
Lebanese Premier League players
Lebanon international footballers
Unidentified people